Sigrid of Denmark may refer to:
Sigrid the Haughty
Sigrid Svendsdatter